Remo is the soundtrack album composed by Anirudh Ravichander, for the 2016 Indian Tamil-language romantic comedy film of the same name, starring Sivakarthikeyan and Keerthy Suresh in the leading roles, while Sathish, Rajendran, Aadukalam Naren, Anson Paul, K. S. Ravikumar and Saranya Ponvannan among others portray supporting roles.

Development 
Anirudh Ravichander composed the soundtrack album and background score for Remo in which he collaborates with Sivakarthikeyan for the fifth time. He joined as the film's composer in June 2015. The album consists of seven songs with one bonus track composed by Anirudh Ravichander and lyrics were written by Vignesh Shivan, Vivek, Ku. Karthik, Inno Genga and L. H. Harish Raam. The audio rights were acquired by Sony Music India. Before the album release, three singles were released from the movie, with lyrics written by Vignesh Shivan. The former two singles were rendered by Anirudh himself, while the latter was sung by Bollywood singer Arjun Kanungo, who made his debut in Tamil as singer alongside Srinidhi Venkatesh. Composer Santhosh Narayanan, also crooned one song for the film, in his first collaboration with Anirudh.

Marketing and release 
The first single from the movie, titled "Remo Nee Kadhalan" was initially supposed to be released on 9 June 2016, but the song was released 23 June, at the film's first look and motion poster release event, which was telecasted live on the official YouTube channel of Sony Music South, and Anirudh gave a live stage performance of the song. The second single "Senjitaley" was launched on 1 July 2016, which performed by Anirudh Ravichander at the 5th South Indian International Movie Awards, held at the Suntec Convention and Exhibition Centre in Singapore, and was launched by actor Vikram.

The third single "Sirrikadhey" was launched in a form of a promotional video song on 18 August 2016. The promo was directed by Prabhu Radhakrishnan, featuring the music composer Anirudh, singers Arjun Kanungo and Srinidhi Venkatesh and music technicians. Sivakarthikeyan and Keerthy Suresh make a cameo appearance, in the video. Another single, "Come Closer" was released on 26 August 2016, which was written and rendered by Inno Genga. The song was a reprised international version of "Sirikkadhey".

The entire album was launched on 5 September 2016, by composer A. R. Rahman, and it was made available to download on the internet. Post-release, an additional song "Veshangalil Poiyillai" written by L. H. Harish Raam and composed and sang by Anirudh was released on 16 October 2016, coinciding with his birthday.

Reception 
The album received mostly positive reviews from audiences and music listeners. Behindwoods rated the album 3.25/5 stating that "Remo's music is definitely a Cupid's arrow from Anirudh". Indiaglitz rated the album 3.5 out of 5, with a verdict "Some beats, a little melody, and a whole lot of fun, Remo is soulful jukebox. Another badge on  young man's shoulder, Anirudh's Remo album shakes up the inner spirit and gets your heart lively and beating. Here we look forward to the movie even more cheerfully now!" Cinemaplus News gave a favourable review with a statement "Entertaining and engaging!" Top 10 Cinema rated that "Anirudh comes up with some energetic numbers, but in many places they sound so much stereotypical as his erstwhile numbers. Maybe for certain seasons, teen audiences would love his musical score, but he has to attempt trying with different genres". Moviecrow rated the album 3 out of 5, and stated "Anirudh delivers another fun filled album which is sure to satiate the fans and though devoid of standout experimental tracks, the feel of the album is vibrant enough to elevate the overall mood of the movie." Studioflicks rated the album 3 out of 5, and stated "Remo songs completely belong to the usual style of Anirudh as he ritually comes up with the tunes to savour the teen groups. But it would be nicer if he can redirect towards different musical genres rather than playing the same tunes to his fans, which might get time worn after some time."

Controversy 
The song "Senjitaley" irked criticism for the glorification of stalking in the song. According to Sudhir Srinivasan, in an article on The Hindu, he stated about the lines from the song "Enakku nee easy-ah laam venaam[...]" which romanticises harassment. The News Minute summarised about this stating "The comments section on YouTube has discussions on the music and how good the song is but barely anything on how problematic it is."

Track listing 
The tracklist of the film was released in the form of an album preview on 1 September 2016, through the official YouTube channel of Sony Music India. The full soundtrack album was released directly through iTunes on 5 September 2016, without hosting any formal launch event.

Background score 

The original background score of the film was released on 21 October 2016, post-release of the film. It contains eighteen original scores, and a bonus track "Veshangalil Poyillai" which was written by Harish Raam L. H. and sung by Anirudh.

Album credits

Producer(s) 
Anirudh Ravichander

Songwriter(s) 
Anirudh Ravichander (Composer, Arranger)

Vignesh Shivan, Vivek, Ku. Karthik, Inno Genga, Harish Raam L. H. (Lyrics)

Performer(s) 
Anirudh Ravichander, Arjun Kanungo, Srinidhi Venkatesh, Richard, Santhosh Narayanan, Nakash Aziz, Inno Genga, Ajesh Ashok, Ranjith

Musicians 

 Guitars - Keba Jeremiah, Godfray Immanuel
 Tavil - Sundhar
 Tabla - M.T Aditya
 Mandolin & Banjo - Seenu 
 Ganjeera - S. Swaminathan
 Flute - Kareem Kamalakar, Naveen Kumar
 Shehnai - Balesh
 Nadaswaram - D. Balasubramani
 Udukkai - Krishna Kishore
 Beatbox done by Hardee Bee (Malaysia)
 Additional Beat Box sampled from YouTube Chorus - Santhosh Hariharan, Nivas, Deepak Blue, Sai Charan, Shakthisree Gopalan, Nadisha Thomas,  Kavitha Thomas, Sanjana Rajnarayan, Shenbagaraj, Maalavika, Veena Murali
 Piano Synth, Rhythm & Electronic Programming - Anirudh Ravichander
 Additional Rhythm - Shashank Vijay

Personnel 

 Music Advisor - Ananthakrishnan
 Musician Coordinators - Samidurai, Velavan
 Modular Synths recorded at - Park Street Studios, Downtown, New York

Sound Engineers 

Albuquerque Records, Chennai - Srinivasan, Ananthakrishnan, Vinay Sridhar
AM Studios, Chennai - S. Sivakumar, Pradeep Menon, Kannan Ganpat, Krishnan Subramaniyan, Manoj Raman, Aravind MS

Production 

 Music Supervisor - Harish Raam L. H.
 Mixed By Vinay Sridhar
 Mastered by Shadab Rayeen @ New Edge Studios, Mumbai
 Mastered for iTunes by Vinay Sridhar
 Music Label - Sony Music India. Pvt. Ltd.

References 

Tamil film soundtracks
2016 soundtrack albums
Sony Music India soundtracks
Anirudh Ravichander soundtracks